Clarence Harvey Trealkill was an American Negro league shortstop in the 1920s.

Trealkill played for the Nashville Elite Giants in 1929. In eight recorded games, he posted seven hits in 25 plate appearances.

References

External links
Baseball statistics and player information from Baseball-Reference Black Baseball Stats and Seamheads

Year of birth missing
Year of death missing
Place of birth missing
Place of death missing
Nashville Elite Giants players
Baseball shortstops